Supertalent is a Croatian talent show. That is a Croatian license version of the British popular talent show Got Talent whose authors are Simon Cowell and Ken Warwick.

Supertalent has five big auditions in the Croatian cities of Split, Rijeka, Zadar, Zagreb, and Osijek. After the auditions there is a semi final and a final show where the public choose one winner. The main prize is 200,000 Croatian kunas. As well as the audience the big part in choosing the candidates is a jury. Member of Croatian jury are: Davor Bilman, Janko Popović Volarić, Maja Šuput and Martina Tomčić. The presenters of show are Frano Ridjan and Igor Mešin. First season aired from 25 September – 18 December 2009. The second season started in September 2010.

Seasons

Season 1 (2009)
First season aired from 25 September – 18 December 2009

Season 2 (2010)
The second season began broadcasting 17 September 2010. Winner was Victoria Novosel.

Season 3 (2011)
The third season started on 18 September 2011 and ended on the 18 December 2011. The Winner was the group Promenade Klub.
Participants finals (finals) Supertalent third season.

Season 4 (2016)

Season 5 (2017) 
5th season started in September 2017, and ended in December 2017. Dancers Emil and Mateja won.

Judges: Davor Bilman, Janko Popović Volarić, Maja Šuput, Martina Tomčić

Season 6 (2018)
6th season started on 24 September 2018, and ended in December 2018.

Judges: Davor Bilman, Janko Popović Volarić, Maja Šuput, Martina Tomčić

Winner: Denis Barta
Runner up: 
Third: Pk dance queen

Season 7 (2019–present)
7th season will start in September 2019.

Judges: Davor Bilman, Janko Popović Volarić, Maja Šuput Tatarinov, Martina Tomčić

References

External links
 Official Website

Croatian reality television series
2009 Croatian television series debuts
Television series by Fremantle (company)
Nova TV (Croatia) original programming